The UND Fighting Hawks women's hockey team represented the University of North Dakota in WCHA women's ice hockey during the 2015-16 NCAA Division I women's ice hockey season.

Offseason

August 17: 5 Fighting Hawks were set to compete in the US-Canada U22 Series held in Lake Placid, NY.  Halli Krzyzaniak and Becca Kohler were chosen by Canada, while Gracen Hirschy, Amy Menke and Lexie Shaw were chosen for the US.

Recruiting

2015–16 Fighting Hawks

Schedule

|-
!colspan=12 style="background:#009e60; color:#fff;"| Regular Season

|-
!colspan=12 style="background:#009e60; color:#fff;"| WCHA Tournament

Awards and honors
Shelby Amsley-Benzie, Academic All-American First Team 

Amy Menke, Forward, All-WCHA Second Team 

Shelby Amsley-Benzie, Goaltender, All-WCHA Third Team 

Halli Krzyzaniak, Defense, All-WCHA Third Team 

Anna Kilponen, Defense, All-WCHA Rookie Team

References

North Dakota
North Dakota Fighting Hawks women's ice hockey seasons
Fight
Fight